Dolfynstrand (Afrikaans for "dolphin beach") is a seaside resort on the South Atlantic coast of Namibia. The residential compound is located in the Walvis Bay constituency and just south of Langstrand, another beach resort located about 20 km north of Walvis Bay on the National Road B2. It is a popular destination for sport fishing in Namibia.

Dolfynstrand was founded in the 1970s and has only a few hundred full-time residents, but during the holiday season its population increases to thousands of visitors.

References

Walvis Bay
Populated places in the Erongo Region
Populated coastal places in Namibia